Alpha is a rural town and a locality in the Barcaldine Region, Queensland, Australia.

Geography

Alpha is in Central West Queensland. It lies on Alpha Creek.

The Capricorn Highway runs through from east to west, and the Clermont-Alpha Road enters from the north-east.

The Central Western railway line passes through the town, which is served by Alpha railway station.

The town is a service centre for the surrounding pastoral properties and travellers on the highway.

History

The town of Alpha is situated approximately 400 kilometres to the west of Rockhampton, with the name being derived from Alpha Pastoral Station, established in 1863. This was a very large station, dominating the area and growing to more than 1,600 square kilometres by the 1890s.

The area was originally visited and partly explored by the New South Wales Surveyor-General, Thomas Mitchell in 1846 and it was his reports that were to encourage settlement, particularly from the 1860s. Early European settlers to move into the region included Robert Donaldson and Agnes Adelaide Donaldson.  

Alpha was initially established as a temporary terminus during construction of the Central Western railway line (then known as the Great Northern line, a name that would be subsequently assigned to the subsequent more northern line west of Townsville to Mount Isa), which was being built westwards from Rockhampton. The major coastal centre was keen to take full advantage of the inland pastoral wealth being generated and pushed for a central railway line. Construction commenced in 1867,  reaching Emerald in 1879 and was opened to Alpha on 22 September 1884. The construction camp continued moving west, but a township remained at the former terminus. Until June 1990, Queensland Rail maintained a locomotive depot in the town.

Alpha Provisional School opened on 30 August 1886. It became Alpha State School on 7 September 1894. A preschool centre was added in 1987.

Churches followed, with the Catholic Church opening in 1890 and the United Protestant Church in 1894. The Sisters of St Joseph of the Sacred Heart opened a Catholic primary school in 1902 and a convent school was established in 1904. A hospital was opened in 1913.

Jericho Shire, which included the town, was incorporated in 1917, with the main shire offices and council facilities located in the town of Jericho.

Killarney Park Provisional School opened in late 1918 as a half time provisional school in conjunction with Glenleigh Provisional School (meaning there was one teacher shared between the two schools). Both schools closed in late 1919 or early 1920 due to low student numbers.

On 8 April 1941, two people were killed when a goods train from Emerald plunged through a section of the wooden rail bridge over Alpha Creek on approach to the Alpha railway station.

On 22 November 2019, the Queensland Government decided to amalgamate the localities in the Barcaldine Region, resulting in five expanded localities based on the larger towns: Alpha, Aramac, Barcaldine, Jericho and Muttaburra. Alpha was expanded to incorporate Beaufort, Drummondslope, Dunrobin (south-eastern corner), Hobartville (north-eastern part), Pine Hill, Port Wine, Sedgeford, and Surbiton.

Mining
On 29 May 2012 the first mine proposed to be developed in the Galilee Basin, known as the Alpha Coal Project, which is a joint development of Indian conglomerate GVK and Hancock Coal, was approved by the Government of Queensland.  

Waratah Coal is planning to develop a new mine close to the town called the China First Coal Project. This mine is to be built on the Bimblebox nature refuge which is home to the endangered black-throated finch.
A counter-view is that Bimblebox is a privately owned former grazing property, now unmanaged and run wild, growing and spreading various noxious weeds.

Waratah Coal's China First Project 2011 Environmental Impact Statement admits that there would be a range of both positive and negative effects on Alpha, and that they would "cause irreversible change to the physical landscape and the social fabric of towns." But it concludes that the development of mines in the vicinity of Alpha presents a unique opportunity for the town and surrounding communities to benefit from sustainable and socially acceptable development.

Bimblebox, a feature-length documentary directed by Michael C O'Connell (Mountaintop Removal), explores the "China First" mega mine project being developed by Waratah Coal close to the town of Alpha in the Galilee basin. The film also examines opposition to the China First mine from the owners of the Bimblebox nature refuge which stands in the path of the proposed project. In a 20 March 2012 press conference Waratah coal CEO Clive Palmer accused environmental groups and the film's producers of being funded by the Central Intelligence Agency.

Education 
Alpha State School is a government primary and secondary (Prep-10) school for boys and girls at 11 Milton Street. In 2017, the school had an enrolment of 40 students with 8 teachers and 10 non-teaching staff (6 full-time equivalent). In 2018, the school had an enrolment of 39 students with 10 teachers and 11 non-teaching staff (6 full-time equivalent).

The nearest secondary schools to Year 12 are in Barcaldine  to the west and Emerald  to the east. Alternatively, there is distance education and boarding schools. Alpha State School provides support to students studying Years 11 and 12 by distance education.

Amenities 
Alpha has a tourism information centre, golf course, art gallery, showground, parks, swimming pool, tennis courts, museum, hardware store, newsagents, bank, pub, grocery store, butcher, baker, candlestick maker, post office, BP, Caltex, craft shop, hairdresser, pharmacy, hospital, police station and fire station.

Barcaldine Regional Council operates a library at the Alpha town hall on Tennyson Street.

Alpha Uniting Church is at 25 Milton Street.

The Alpha branch of the Queensland Country Women's Association meets at the Uniting Church Hall at 4724 Milton Street.

References

External links

 
 
Queensland places - Alpha, State Library of Queensland blog article

Towns in Queensland
Barcaldine Region
Localities in Queensland